Qulanlu-ye Sofla (also Romanized as Qūlānlū-ye Soflá; also known as Qūlānlū-ye Pā’īn and Qūlānlū) is a village in Takmaran Rural District, Sarhad District, Shirvan County, North Khorasan Province, Iran. At the 2006 census, its population was 351, in 95 families.

References 

Populated places in Shirvan County